Initiate is the second solo album by the Northern Irish singer Mervyn Spence, once again released under the pseudonym "O'Ryan", in 1995.

Initiate contains no original material, instead solely consisting of ten covers of various tracks from Tom Galley's Phenomena project (which Spence was involved with during its initial stages, and held the rights to at the time), and three re-recorded songs from Spence's debut album, Something Strong.

The recordings of "Still the Night", "Did It All for Love" and "No Retreat - No Surrender" found on Initiate would later be included on the Phenomena compilation boxset released in 2006, ''The Complete Works'.

Track listing

Personnel

 Mervyn Spence - lead & backing vocals, bass programming, additional guitar
 Jason Fillingham - keyboards, drum programming
 Huwie Lucas - lead & rhythm guitars
 Martin Taylor - classical guitar
 "Midi Man" - drums
 Carl Brazil - percussion
 Tracey Riggan - backing vocals

Production personnel
 Mervyn Spence - production
 Jason Fillingham - production, engineering
 Simon Hanhart - mixing

References 

1995 albums
Mervyn Spence albums
Covers albums